Li Bihu (born February 1946) is a Chinese agronomist best known for developing the hybrid rice. He was a student and assistant of Yuan Longping. He is a member of the Communist Party of China. He was a delegate to the 11th and 12th National Congress of the Communist Party of China. He was a delegate to the 9th and 10th National People's Congress.

Biography
Li was born in Yuanling County, Hunan, in February 1946. After graduating from Anjiang Agricultural School (now ) in 1966, he became the assistant of Yuan Longping. On November 23, 1970, he discovered common wild rice with male abortion in Hainan Island, which made great contribution to the research of hybrid rice. In 1973, he and Yuan Longping first developed strong dominant hybrid rice in the world. In 1976, he joined the Communist Party of China. In 1984, he joined the faculty of Anjiang Agricultural School, where he served as vice president and deputy party chief and was promoted to party chief in 1988. He became director of Hunan Hybrid Rice Research Institute in 1988, and served until 2003. He is now the president of Huaihua Vocational and Technical College and vice chairman of Standing Committee of Huaihua People's Congress.

Honours and awards
 1981 National Special Invention Award
 1999 State Science and Technology Progress Award (Third Class)
 2008 China Agricultural Talent Award

References

1946 births
Living people
People from Yuanling County
Scientists from Hunan
Hunan Agricultural University alumni
Delegates to the 9th National People's Congress
Delegates to the 10th National People's Congress